Diane Catherine Sealy (born 6 June 1961), known as Dee C. Lee, is a British singer. Born to Saint Lucian parents, she grew up in south east London. Early in her career, she was a member of the British band Central Line under the aliases Dee Sealy in 1981 and Dee C Lee in 1983. She was also a backing singer for Wham!, and then became a member of The Style Council, as well as performing as a solo artist.

Career
Lee was an ex-member and backing vocalist from the funk/soul group Central Line under the alias Dee Sealy in 1981 and her current stage name Dee C Lee in 1983. She was also a backing vocalist for the pop group Wham! in the early 1980s and appeared in their music videos for the songs "Wham Rap! (Enjoy What You Do)", Young Guns (Go for It)" and "Club Tropicana".

Following her departure from Wham!, Lee released her first solo single, "Selina Wow Wow", in 1984.

In 1984, she then worked with The Style Council and appeared on their debut studio album Café Bleu (released as My Ever Changing Moods in North America). Lee's vocals appear on the tracks "Headstart for Happiness", "It Didn't Matter", "The Lodgers", "Walls Come Tumbling Down", and "Shout to the Top". Lee continued to record solo material during this time, but singles "Yippee Yi Yay!" and "Don't Do It Baby" failed to chart.

In 1985, Lee was the featured artist on Masquerade's version of Set It Off. In the same year, after the release of the second Style Council album Our Favourite Shop, and a stint working with the band Animal Nightlife, Lee released another solo single; the self-penned ballad "See the Day". The single became a hit and peaked at No.3 in the UK chart in December 1985, selling a quarter of a million copies in the UK alone, and earning Lee a silver disc. Twenty years later, the song was covered by Girls Aloud, their version peaking at No. 9 on the UK Singles Chart in December 2005. Her follow-up singles, a cover of Judie Tzuke's "Come Hell or Waters High" and "Hold On" failed to make the UK Top 40. All tracks were featured on her 1986 album Shrine.

Throughout the rest of the 1980s, Lee continued to work with The Style Council on their albums The Cost of Loving (1987) and Confessions of a Pop Group (1988). She also worked with the band on their 1989 recording Modernism: A New Decade, but this album was rejected by the band's label, Polydor, and did not see a release until almost ten years later, when it was included in the boxed set, The Complete Adventures of The Style Council.

Between 1989 and 1991, Lee teamed up with Robert Howard of The Blow Monkeys to form Slam Slam. They achieved a number of minor UK club successes including "Move (Dance All Night)" and "Free Your Feelings", the latter produced by Young Disciples. In 1993, Lee collaborated with Gang Starr frontman Guru on a single from his solo project Jazzmatazz called "No Time to Play" which also featured Ronny Jordan. It peaked at No. 25 in the UK in November 1993. Later in the 1990s, Lee released two further solo albums; Things Will Be Sweeter (1994) and Smiles (1998).

In 2006 Lee had a small role as a pop star in the film Rabbit Fever. In September 2007 she performed her hit "See the Day" on ITV1's Loose Women show. In September 2007, she also performed at a charity event in aid of combating domestic violence.

Lee also portrayed Preaching Nut-Nut in a 2008 short film, The Town That Boars Me, which tells the tale of a Pig Boy created by the lonely town butcher. The Pig Boy, now banished from the town, returns at nightfall to torment the local women and satisfy his insatiable fetish for high-heeled shoes. The film was released in London on 28 August 2008.

On 31 May 2009, Lee joined ex-Level 42 musicians, Mike Lindup and Phil Gould, to play a comeback gig with a collective called 'Favoured Nations' at Ginglik, Shepherd's Bush, London. In October of that year, she played a gig at Dingwalls in Camden Town.  She continued to play one-off shows in London venues in 2010, and played in Chelsea in March 2011.

In January 2018, she posted a New Year's message on her website, expressing her sadness at the death of her former Wham! bandmate, George Michael, and reported she had been writing with keyboardist and composer Arden Heart and hoped to be recording new material and gigging.

Personal life
Lee was married to her fellow Style Council member Paul Weller from 1987 until they divorced in 1998. They have two children, daughter Leah Weller and son Nathaniel Weller, who is known as "Natt".

Discography

Albums

Singles

References

External links
 Official website
 Dee C. Lee at Facebook
 
 [ Dee C. Lee] at AllMusic.
 Dee C. Lee at Discogs.

1961 births
Living people
Wham! members
The Style Council members
People from Balham
20th-century Black British women singers
British contemporary R&B singers
English people of Barbadian descent
English soul singers
English women pop singers